All Of Us In Our Night is the second full-length album released by Modern Skirts. The album was released in October 2008 and features Mike Mills from R.E.M.

Track listing
"Chanel"
"Soft Pedals"
"Chokehold"
"Radio Breaks"
"Yugo"
"Face Down"
"Conversational"
"Astronaut"
"Eveready"
"Motorcade"
"Mrs."
"Like Lunatics"

References 
MetroMix
Hearya
Athens Music
Paste Magazine
NPR
Flagpole

2008 albums
Modern Skirts albums